New Model Army may refer to:
 New Model Army, one of the Parliamentarian armies of the English Civil War
 Douglas Haig's units of the British Expeditionary Force decimated at the Somme in World War I
 New Model Army Revolver, a percussion revolver popular during the American Civil War
 New Model Army (band), a British punk / indie music band founded in the 1980s

fr:New Model Army